Kashan Admani (Full name: Muhammad Kashan Admani) (Urdu: کاشان ادمانی) is a Pakistani musician, composer, music producer, film producer, film director, guitar player, founder of music band Mizmaar, and the CEO of Dream Station Productions. Born in Karachi, Kashan has performed with many renowned musicians, including the Grammy nominated drummer and music producer Simon Phillips (drummer). He took to keyboards with he was only 5 years old and by the time he reached 4th grade, he had composed his first song.

Early life and career 
Admani began his mainstream career with his band Mizmaar and he released his debut album Kash in 2003. In his career, Kashan has performed with renowned musicians of Pakistan including Strings, Najam Sheraz, Haroon, Junoon (band) Strings, Faakhir, Shuja Haider, and many others. He is also the founder and owner of state-of-the-art music production facility Dream Station Productions located in Karachi. Kashan Admani has had many accolades in the world of music, including his song Sitara featuring in Hollywood movie Dragon War. He has also been producing music of various TVCs for multiple brands. He has also produced the debut album for the band Raeth (band). He has also produced songs and albums for multiple artists like Najam Sheraz, Haroon, Usman Riaz, and others.

Mizmaar 
Admani formed Mizmaar in 2000 with drummer Roger Faria, bassist Russell Owen, and vocalist Rehan-ul-Haq. The band also performed in Pepsi Battle of the Bands in 2002. Post Pepsi Battle of the Bands, Rehan-ul-Haq parted ways and Daniyal Badshah joined Mizmaar as the vocalist. The band has released two albums, Kash and Sitara. Their second album Sitara was released by Universal Music India.

Solo career 
Recently, Admani assembled 31 artists for a song Taare that was also featured in Gulf News. His production facility Dream Station Productions is Pakistan's first international standard, commercial 7:1 surround audio recording and post-production facility in Karachi. Currently, he is working on his guitar album with Simon Phillips from Toto and also invited him to Pakistan to record and conduct a masterclass.

Coke Studio 
Admani appeared in Coke Studio Season 9 as a house band member and worked on a number of songs including Afreen Afreen, and Janay Na Tu. He also worked with Abida Parveen, Ali Sethi, Zeb Bangash, Ahmed Jahenzeb, Umair Jaswal, and Meesha Shafi during the show.

Acoustic Station 
Admani has launched his own music web series named Acoustic Station through Dream Station Productions. This web series has 14 episodes and each episode comes out on Wednesday. The band Kashmir has featured in the inaugural episode and performed their song Soch. In the second episode, Maha Ali Kazmi made an appearance with a cover of Kashmiri song Sahibo. The third episode featured Latif Ali Khan who performed a Saraiki song Lolak. The fourth episode featured Nida Hussain with an original song "Jee Loon".

Carma - The Movie 
Admani has recently directed and produced a feature film by the name of Carma - The Movie. The movie features top Pakistani actors including Adnan Siddiqui, Naveen Waqar, Zhalay Sarhadi, Paras Masroor, Arjumand Rahim, Lili Caseley, and more. Carma is Pakistan's first new age revenge crime thriller with a twisted storyline. Carma's screenplay covers 50 scenes shot entirely in and around cars. Hence, the name Carma is derived (Cars + Karma).  

He has also composed, produced, and mixed the songs and soundtracks of the movie Carma. The movie features 7 songs.

Global collaboration 
Admani enlisted top musical talent from all over the world for a new song 'We Are One'. We Are One features 40 musicians from all over the world including Grammy Award winners. Grammy winning violinist Charlie Bisharat, Grammy nominee drummer and music Simon Phillips (drummer), bassist Stuart Hamm, percussionist Gumbi Ortiz, and drummer Taylor Simpson feature in the song from the United States. Other artists include guitarist, composer, and record producer Roman Miroshnichenko from Russia, singer-songwriter Dr. Palash Sen of Euphoria (Indian band) from India, actress and dancer Luiza Prochet from Brazil, Matt Laurent from Canada, and singer-songwriter Lili Caseley from the United Kingdom.

Artists from Pakistan include Faakhir Mehmood, Omran Shafique, Imran Akhoond, Najam Sheraz, Bilal Ali (Kashmir), Amir Azhar, Natasha Baig, Natasha Khan (Pakistani singer), Ahsan Bari (Sounds of Kolachi), Farhad Humayun (Overload (Pakistani band)), Asad Rasheed (Mizmaar), Maha Ali Kazmi, Raafay Israr, Farooq Ahmed (Aaroh, Ali Khan (singer), Dino Ali, Salwa Najam, Babar Sheikh, Imran Akhoond, Khaled Anam, Raafay Israr, Nida Hussain, Faisal Malik, Nazia Zuberi (Rushk), Meraal Hassan, Alex Shahbaz, Ashir Wajahat, Fahad Ahmed, Ammar Khaled, Eahab Akhtar, and Sabir Zafar.

Contributions to music industry of Pakistan 
Admani has produced several music albums for a number of mainstream musicians including Raeth (band), Haroon, Najam Sheraz, and more. He also produced the album for Usman Riaz. On Raeth's album, he played all the instruments, recorded, and mixed it as well. Kashan's portfolio includes production of several popular jingles including Mobilink's Hum Bolain Muhabbat Ki Zuban. He also revamped the relaunch ads music and also re-edited the advertisement for telecommunication network Zong 4G. His work also includes countless jingles and music score for TV ads.

References

External links 
 Kashan Admani on Facebook

Living people
1979 births
Pakistani rock guitarists
People from Karachi
A-Class biography articles